Homer Alonzo Ramey (March 2, 1891 – April 13, 1960) was an American lawyer and politician who served three terms as a U.S. Representative from Ohio from 1943 to 1949.

Biography 
He was born on a farm near Sparta, South Bloomfield Township, Ohio. His parents were Burt C. and Mae (Bockoven) Ramey. He attended the grade and high schools.
He was graduated from Park College of Parkville, Missouri in 1913, and from the law school of Ohio Northern University at Ada in 1916. He attended Cincinnati Law School as a special student in 1917.
He was admitted to the bar in 1917 and commenced practice in Put-in-Bay, Ohio.

Political career 
Ramey served as member of the State house of representatives from 1920 to 1924.
He served in the Ohio Senate in 1925 and 1926.
He served as judge of the municipal court of Toledo, Ohio from 1926 to 1943.
He was an unsuccessful candidate for election in 1938 to the Seventy-sixth Congress.

Ramey was elected as a Republican to the Seventy-eighth, Seventy-ninth, and Eightieth Congresses (January 3, 1943 – January 3, 1949).
He was an unsuccessful candidate for reelection in 1948 to the Eighty-first Congress and for election in 1950 to the Eighty-second Congress.
He was appointed in 1949 and subsequently elected judge of the municipal court of Toledo and served in that capacity until his death in Toledo, Ohio, on April 13, 1960.
He was interred in Ottawa Hills Memorial Park.

Personal life 
Ramey married Ruby Dearth on November 28, 1915. He was a member of Masons, Fraternal Order of Eagles, I.O.O.F., Modern Woodmen of America, and Jr. O.U.A.M.

References

Sources

1891 births
1960 deaths
People from Morrow County, Ohio
Republican Party Ohio state senators
Republican Party members of the Ohio House of Representatives
Ohio lawyers
Park University alumni
Claude W. Pettit College of Law alumni
Politicians from Toledo, Ohio
University of Cincinnati College of Law alumni
20th-century American politicians
Lawyers from Toledo, Ohio
20th-century American lawyers
Republican Party members of the United States House of Representatives from Ohio